The 1995 Players Championship was a golf tournament in Florida on the PGA Tour, held  at TPC Sawgrass in Ponte Vedra Beach, southeast of Jacksonville. It was the 22nd Players Championship.  

On a wind-dried course, Lee Janzen won at 283 (−5), a stroke ahead of runner-up Bernhard Langer. Janzen sank a  putt for par on the final hole for the win. 

Defending champion Greg Norman finished eleven strokes back, in a tie for 37th place.

Venue

Eligibility requirements 
The top 125 PGA Tour members from Final 1994 Official Money List
All winners of PGA Tour events awarding official money and official victory status in the preceding 12 months concluding with the Nestle Invitational
Designated players
Any foreign player meeting the requirements of a designated player whether or not he is a PGA Tour member
Winners in the last 10 calendar years of The Players Championship, Masters Tournament, U.S. Open, PGA Championship and NEC World Series of Golf
British Open winners since 1990
Six players, not otherwise eligible, designated by The Players Championship Committee as "special selections"
To complete a field of 144 players, those players in order, not otherwise eligible, from the 1995 Official Money List, as of the completion of the Nestle Invitational

Source:

Field
Fulton Allem, Robert Allenby, Billy Andrade, Paul Azinger, Ian Baker-Finch, Seve Ballesteros, Dave Barr, Chip Beck, Jay Don Blake, Guy Boros, Michael Bradley, Mark Brooks, Brad Bryant, Bob Burns, Curt Byrum, Mark Calcavecchia, Mark Carnevale, Brandel Chamblee, Brian Claar, Keith Clearwater, Lennie Clements, Russ Cochran, John Cook, Fred Couples, Ben Crenshaw, Glen Day, Jay Delsing, Clark Dennis, Chris DiMarco, David Duval, David Edwards, Joel Edwards, Steve Elkington, Ernie Els, Bob Estes, Nick Faldo, Brad Faxon, David Feherty, Rick Fehr, Dan Forsman, Robin Freeman, David Frost, Fred Funk, Jim Furyk, Jim Gallagher Jr., Robert Gamez, Bob Gilder, Bill Glasson, Paul Goydos, Wayne Grady, Hubert Green, Ken Green, Jay Haas, Gary Hallberg, Donnie Hammond, Mike Heinen, Nolan Henke, Brian Henninger, Scott Hoch, Mike Hulbert, Ed Humenik, John Huston, Hale Irwin, Peter Jacobsen, Lee Janzen, Brian Kamm, Tom Kite, Greg Kraft, Neal Lancaster, Bernhard Langer, Tom Lehman, Justin Leonard, Wayne Levi, Bruce Lietzke, Bob Lohr, Davis Love III, Steve Lowery, Sandy Lyle, Andrew Magee, Jeff Maggert, John Mahaffey, Roger Maltbie, Billy Mayfair, Blaine McCallister, Mark McCumber, Jim McGovern, Mark McNulty, Rocco Mediate, Phil Mickelson, Larry Mize, Yoshi Mizumaki, Colin Montgomerie, Gil Morgan, John Morse, Jodie Mudd, Larry Nelson, Jack Nicklaus, Frank Nobilo, Greg Norman, Andy North, Mark O'Meara, Brett Ogle, David Ogrin, José María Olazábal, Masashi Ozaki, Naomichi Ozaki, Jesper Parnevik, Craig Parry, Steve Pate, Dennis Paulson, Corey Pavin, Calvin Peete, Kenny Perry, Dan Pohl, Nick Price, Dicky Pride, Dillard Pruitt, Tom Purtzer, Mike Reid, Steve Rintoul, Loren Roberts, Gene Sauers, Scott Simpson, Vijay Singh, Jeff Sluman, Mike Springer, Craig Stadler, Mike Standly, Paul Stankowski, Payne Stewart, Dave Stockton Jr., Curtis Strange, Steve Stricker, Mike Sullivan, Hal Sutton, Doug Tewell, Jim Thorpe, Kirk Triplett, Ted Tryba, Bob Tway, Scott Verplank, Bobby Wadkins, Lanny Wadkins, Duffy Waldorf, Tom Watson, D. A. Weibring, John Wilson, Ian Woosnam, Fuzzy Zoeller

Round summaries

First round
Thursday, March 23, 1995

Source:

Second round
Friday, March 24, 1995

Source:

Third round
Saturday, March 25, 1995

Source:

Final round
Sunday, March 26, 1995

References

External links
The Players Championship website

1995
1995 in golf
1995 in American sports
1995 in sports in Florida
March 1995 sports events in the United States